Suhasini Mulay (born 20 November 1950) is an Indian actress in Assamese, Bollywood and Marathi films as well as television. She won five National Film Award .

Early life and education
Suhasini was born in a Marathi
speaking family in Patna where she spent the early part of her childhood. She lost her father when she was only three and was brought up by her mother, noted documentary filmmaker and film historian Vijaya Mulay.  Suhasini was attracted to film because of her mother.

Personal life 
Mulay was in an extended live-in relationship that ended in 1990. On 16 January 2011 she got married at Arya Samaj to a physicist, Prof. Atul Gurtu.

Career
In 1965 she was chosen by Pears Soap to be its model. It was this ad film which caught Mrinal Sen's attention and he signed her for Bhuvan Shome (1969).

Though Bhuvan Shome proved to be a milestone in Indian cinema, Suhasini did not pursue acting as a career. Instead she enrolled at the McGill University in Montreal, Canada for a course in agricultural technology with specialization in soil chemistry and microbiology. She also obtained a degree in mass communication, and majored in film, radio, TV, journalism and print from the same university.

Suhasini returned to India in 1975 and worked as an assistant to Satyajit Ray in the Bengali film Jana Aranya. Later she joined Mrinal Sen as an assistant director in Mrigaya. Since then, she has been actively producing films and has made over 60 documentaries. She achieved national awards for four of them.

Almost 30 years after Bhuvan Shome, she made a great comeback to mainstream Bollywood cinema, through Gulzar's Hu Tu Tu for which she received a national award as the best supporting actress. She has been playing mother roles in Bollywood since then. She has worked on Jaane Kya Baat Hui, a television serial. Currently she completed her latest film PEEDA directed by Hemant Verma. PEEDA recently received best feature film award at FOG film festival USA.

Filmography

Films

Television

Accolades

References

External links

 

Actresses from Patna
1953 births
Living people
Actresses in Hindi cinema
Indian television actresses
Actresses in Marathi cinema
Best Supporting Actress National Film Award winners
Actresses in Gujarati cinema
20th-century Indian actresses
21st-century Indian actresses
Actresses in Hindi television